Kassio Fernando Rocha Martins (born 14 September 1992) commonly known as Kassio, is a Brazilian footballer who currently plays for Ríver AC.

Career
On 23 April 2011, Kassio made his debut for América Teófilo Otoni in an 8–1 home loss against Cruzeiro in their semi-final first leg tie of the Campeonato Mineiro.

References

External links

1992 births
Living people
Brazilian expatriate footballers
Brazilian footballers
Expatriate footballers in Bulgaria
FC Botev Vratsa players
First Professional Football League (Bulgaria) players
Association football midfielders